The National Capital District of Papua New Guinea is the incorporated area around Port Moresby, which is the capital of Papua New Guinea.  Although it is surrounded by Central Province, where Port Moresby is also the capital, it is technically not a part of that province. It covers an area of 240 km2 and has a population of 364,125 (2011 census). It is represented by three open MPs and an NCD-wide representative in the National Parliament of Papua New Guinea who acts as Governor of the National Capital District; however, these MPs do not have the same powers as elsewhere in the country due to the role of the National Capital District Commission.

Governors

The National Capital District did not have a decentralised administration with a Premier, as with the other provinces, prior to 1995; however, since the 1995 reforms of provincial governments it has been headed by a Governor, albeit one with more limited powers.

Local-level governments
Local-level governments of National Capital District are:

References 

 
Provinces of Papua New Guinea
Capital districts and territories

pl:Narodowy Dystrykt Stołeczny